The 2020 Total 6 Hours of Spa-Francorchamps was an endurance sports car racing event held at the Circuit de Spa-Francorchamps, Stavelot, Belgium on 13–14 August 2020. The event was originally scheduled to be held on 25 April, but was postponed on 16 March due to the COVID-19 pandemic. Spa-Francorchamps served as the sixth race of the 2019–20 FIA World Endurance Championship, and was the ninth running of the event as part of the championship. The race was won by the #7 Toyota TS050 Hybrid.

Qualifying

Qualifying results
Pole position winners in each class are marked in bold.

 The #29 Racing Team Nederland started from the back of the grid after the second driver failed to set a time.

Race

Race Result
The minimum number of laps for classification (70% of the overall winning car's race distance) was 101 laps.

Standings after the race

2019–2020 LMP World Endurance Drivers Championship

2019-2020 LMP1 World Endurance Championship

 Note: Only the top five positions are included for the Drivers Championship standings.

2019–2020 World Endurance GTE Drivers Championship 

2019-2020 World Endurance GTE Manufacturers Championship

 Note: Only the top five positions are included for the Drivers Championship standings.

References

6 Hours of Spa-Francorchamps
Auto races in Belgium
Circuit de Spa-Francorchamps
Spa-Francorchamps
6 Hours of Spa-Francorchamps
2020 in Belgian motorsport